James Jackson (28 April 1890 – 29 August 1976) was an Australian rules footballer who played with St Kilda, Collingwood and Hawthorn in the Victorian Football League.

Family
The son of Thomas Charles Jackson (1856–1905) and Martha Anne Jackson, nee Cheetham (1861–1933), Jim Jackson was born at Maidstone in the north-west of Melbourne on 28 April 1890.

Football
Jackson was a wingman and had a long career with 17 years between his first and last season. 

He started his career at St Kilda in 1909 but after managing just one game crossed to Collingwood the following year. He was unlucky not to play in a premiership team during his time at the Magpies as he was on military service when they won in 1917 and 1919. 

He finished his career at Hawthorn, firstly in the VFA and then when the club joined the VFL in 1925 when he was appointed their inaugural VFL captain.

In 1932 Jackson returned to Hawthorn as their non-playing coach but the Hawks finished with just three wins and the wooden spoon.

References

External links 

Collingwood FC profile

1890 births
1976 deaths
Australian rules footballers from Melbourne
Australian Rules footballers: place kick exponents
St Kilda Football Club players
Collingwood Football Club players
Hawthorn Football Club (VFA) players
Hawthorn Football Club players
Hawthorn Football Club coaches
Australian military personnel of World War I
People from the City of Maribyrnong
Military personnel from Melbourne